Lars Henrik Weiss (born May 20, 1971, in Frederiksberg) is a Danish politician, who served as acting Lord Mayor of Copenhagen from October 19, 2020, to December 31, 2021.

References 

1971 births
Living people
Danish politicians